Kurt Presslmayr (born 6 February 1943) is an Austrian retired slalom canoeist who competed from the mid-1960s to the early 1970s. He won three medals at the ICF Canoe Slalom World Championships, with two golds (K-1: 1965, K-1 team: 1971) and a bronze (K-1 team: 1965).

Presslmayr also finished tenth in the K-1 event at the 1972 Summer Olympics in Munich.

He was named Austrian Sportsman of the Year in 1965.

References

1943 births
Austrian male canoeists
Canoeists at the 1972 Summer Olympics
Living people
Olympic canoeists of Austria
Medalists at the ICF Canoe Slalom World Championships